Neomordellistena roeri is a beetle in the genus Neomordellistena of the family Mordellidae. It was described in 1995 by Horak.

References

roeri
Beetles described in 1995